William Russell House may refer to:

William Russell House (Lewes, Delaware), listed on the NRHP in Delaware
William Russell House, in Crystal Falls, Michigan, listed on the NRHP in Iron County, Michigan
Joseph and William Russell House, in Providence, Rhode Island, listed on the NRHP in Rhode Island

See also
Russell House (disambiguation)